Shorea balanocarpoides (called, along with some other species in the genus Shorea, white meranti or yellow meranti) is a species of plant in the family Dipterocarpaceae. It is found in Sumatra, Peninsular Malaysia and Borneo.

References

balanocarpoides
Trees of Sumatra
Trees of Peninsular Malaysia
Trees of Borneo
Endangered plants
Taxonomy articles created by Polbot